Uruachi  is one of the 67 municipalities of Chihuahua, in northern Mexico. The municipal seat lies at Uruachi. The municipality covers an area of 3,058.31 km2.

As of 2010, the municipality had a total population of 8,200, up from 7,934 as of 2005. 

As of 2010, the town of Uruachi had a population of 1,199. Other than the town of Uruachi, the municipality had 422 localities, none of which had a population over 1,000.

Geography

Towns and villages
The municipality has 268 localities. The largest are:

History
Five residents of Santísimo de Abajo were shot and killed and their vehicle was burned on January 31, 2021.

References

Municipalities of Chihuahua (state)